Fortín de Ludueña is a multi-use stadium in Rosario, Argentina.  It is currently the home ground for Club Atlético Tiro Federal Argentino.  The stadium holds 18,000 people.

Sports venues in Argentina
Football venues in Argentina
Tiro Federal